Zakaria Chol Gideon Gakmar (1957 – 29 July 2010) was a Sudanese politician, belonging to the Sudan People's Liberation Movement (SPLM). He was elected to the Lakes State Legislative Assembly in the 2010 election as a candidate on the SPLM party list.

Following his death, Zakaria Chol was lauded as a hero in the governor's speech at the 2010 Martyrs' Day celebrations in Rumbek.

References

1957 births
2010 deaths
Sudan People's Liberation Movement politicians
Sudanese politicians
People from Lakes (state)
Members of the Lakes State Legislative Assembly